Andrés Uriel Gallego Henao (April 1, 1950 – April 17, 2014) was a Colombian civil engineer and politician.  He served as the 8th Minister of Transport from 2002 to 2010 during the administration of President Álvaro Uribe.

Gallego died at the Hospital Pablo Tobón Uribe in Medellín, Colombia, at the age of 64.  He was buried in the Campos de Paz cemetery.

References

1950 births
2014 deaths
Ministers of Transport of Colombia
Colombian civil engineers
National University of Colombia alumni
People from Antioquia Department